Pirates of Catalonia (PIRATA.CAT) is a political party in Catalonia. The party is based on the model of the Swedish Pirate Party and is a member of the Pirate Parties International, it supports intellectual property reform, open access to culture and knowledge, transparency and direct democracy.

The party was founded in August 2010 and was officially registered as a political party in October. The party contested for the first time in an election for the 2010 Catalan election, held on 28 November 2010, where it got 6.489 votes (0,21%). The party held its first assembly on December 22, 2010 in Barcelona.

Electoral results

Cortes Generales

Parliament of Catalonia

Local elections
The party ran candidates in local elections in May 2011. It gained two municipal councillors, one in Sant Fruitós de Bages and another in Santa Coloma de Gramenet. They tripled results in Barcelona, from 1767 votes (0.25%) to 4659 (0.77%). In Hospitalet they increased from 0.24% to 0.99%. In Lleida from 0.23% to 0.80%. In Mataró of 0.20% to 1.19% and Mollet, from 0.20% to 0.83%

(1) In the candidates list of  Candidatura d'Unitat Popular.
(2) In coalition with Gent de Gramenet.
(3) In coalition with Imagina't Sant Fruitós - AM.

See also
 List of political parties in Catalonia
 Pirate Party (Spain)

Notes

References

External links

Official site

Catalonia
Republican parties in Spain
Political parties in Catalonia
Political parties established in 2010
2010 establishments in Spain